O' Donnell Park is a GAA stadium in County Donegal, Ireland. The home ground of the St Eunan's club, it is situated between the Letterkenny Regional Sports and Leisure Complex and Ballymacool Park on the outskirts of the town. The Donegal county football team uses O'Donnell Park as a venue for matches (as does the county hurling team).

History
The ground has hosted Gaelic games since the 1930s when the St Eunan's club bought the land for £300. The ground opened on Sunday 2 May 1937, with the Bishop of Raphoe's blessing of the park, a hurling match between Donegal and Antrim, an address from GAA President Bob O'Keeffe and a football match between Donegal and Armagh.

During the Fleadh Cheoil na hÉireann 2006, the ground was used as a makeshift campsite for visitors to the town for the duration of the festival.

The Sam Maguire Cup and members of Donegal's 2012 All-Ireland SFC winning team attended a world record attempt at O'Donnell Park on 29 September 2012.

The O'Donnell Park pitch was "highly commended" at the 2019 National Pitch Awards, and finished in the top six alongside such stadiums as Páirc Tailteann, Nowlan Park, Pearse Stadium and Dr Hyde Park.

During the COVID-19 pandemic, O'Donnell Park was used as a drive-through test centre.

County matches
Having formerly been a venue for football matches played by the Donegal county team, O'Donnell Park went unused for this purpose for three decades. On 25 March 2007, O'Donnell Park hosted its first inter-county football match since this hiatus, with Donegal defeating reigning All-Ireland champions Kerry by a scoreline of 1–15 to 0–13 in Division 1 (the top tier) of the National Football League. There was a half-hour delay to the game after the Kerry team were unable to arrive on time due to fog at the airport. TG4 broadcast the match live to a national audience. Donegal followed up their victory by winning the 2007 National Football League title.

Donegal have played the following league games at O'Donnell Park since then.

NFL matches at the venue have tended to be competitive, with opponents finding it difficult to leave with full points if they do. 2014's 2–11 to 0–10 victory over Monaghan, an eight-point win, is Donegal's biggest victory at O'Donnell Park.

It has also been used by the Donegal senior hurling team, for example in the 2020 Nicky Rackard Cup.

See also
 List of Gaelic Athletic Association stadiums
 List of stadiums in Ireland by capacity

References

Buildings and structures in Letterkenny
Donegal GAA venues
Sport in Letterkenny